Shota may refer to:
 Shota (dance), a traditional dance from Kosovo
 Shota (Georgian given name), a Georgian given name
 Shōta, a Japanese given name
 Shota (wrestler), Japanese professional wrestler 
 Shotacon, a childlike male character in Japanese anime and manga
 Shota the Witch Woman, a character from Terry Goodkind's fantasy series The Sword of Truth